Milton Goode (born February 16, 1960, in Tinton Falls, New Jersey) is a retired high jumper from the United States, who participated at the 1984 Summer Olympics in Los Angeles, California.

Goode was raised in Tinton Falls, New Jersey, and attended Monmouth Regional High School, where he jumped .The first time he ever encountered the high jump was during a demonstration by his physical education instructor in High School, later setting the school record, jumping . After graduating high school in 1979, he moved to Florida, and then California pursuing his athletic career at Alameda Junior College (now known as College of Alameda).

While in California he became a professional jumper, and qualified in the United States Olympic Trials to become a part of the U.S. team.

Goode has been a resident of Freehold Township, New Jersey.

References

External links
1984 Year Rankings

1960 births
Living people
American male high jumpers
Athletes (track and field) at the 1984 Summer Olympics
Monmouth Regional High School alumni
Olympic track and field athletes of the United States
People from Freehold Township, New Jersey
People from Tinton Falls, New Jersey
Sportspeople from Monmouth County, New Jersey
Track and field athletes from New Jersey